Anthony Juniper  (born 24 September 1960) is a British campaigner, writer, sustainability adviser and environmentalist who served as Executive Director of Friends of the Earth, England, Wales and Northern Ireland. He was Vice Chair of Friends of the Earth International from 2000 to 2008.

He was the Green Party's parliamentary candidate for the Cambridge constituency at the 2010 general election.

In 2019 he was appointed chairman of Natural England.

Academic background
Raised in Oxford, Juniper attended Bristol University, taking a joint honours BSc in psychology and zoology in 1983, followed by a master's degree in conservation from University College, London in 1988. He became a Senior Associate and later a Fellow with the Cambridge Institute for Sustainability Leadership, based at the University of Cambridge. In 2013 he was awarded honorary Doctor of Science degrees by the University of Bristol and the University of Plymouth. In 2016 Juniper was declared as a Harmony Professor of Practice with the University of Wales Trinity St David.

Parrot conservation
Juniper is a recognised authority on parrots, having worked at BirdLife International on efforts to conserve rare species of these birds. He was for example involved in efforts to save the Spix's macaw, one of the most endangered birds in the world. In his book Spix's Macaw: The Race to Save the World's Rarest Bird he criticised private holders of birds such as Antonio de Dios's Birds International, arguing that the Spix's macaws should be returned to their native country, Brazil, for captive breeding and reintroduction to their natural habitat, which is still in decline. The story of the Spix's Macaw was adapted to form the basic plot to the film Rio. His book 'Parrots of the World' (co-authored with Mike Parr) was awarded Reference Book of the Year by the UK Library Association in 1999.

Friends of the Earth
Juniper joined Friends of the Earth in 1990 to lead the organisation's tropical rainforest campaign. He later led Friends of the Earth's work on biodiversity and chaired a multi-organisation campaign that resulted in the 2000 Countryside and Rights of Way Act. He was later Campaigns Director and played a prominent role in campaigns on GM crops, world trade, transport and industrial pollution. He became Friends of the Earth Director in 2003 and oversaw the campaign that ensured the inclusion of a Climate Change Bill in the Queen's Speech of 15 November 2006. This was supported by his "Big Ask" Campaign throughout 2005 and 2006, when he worked with Radiohead frontman Thom Yorke. The Climate Change Act of 2008 that was the result of this campaign was the first of its kind in the world. Thom Yorke worked with Juniper again in 2010 for a one-off benefit gig in the Cambridge constituency, where Juniper stood as the Green Party candidate in the General Election.

Other activities
In addition to his 18 years at Friends of the Earth, Juniper has worked in a variety of other roles, including as a special adviser to the Prince of Wales Charities' International Sustainability Unit, having previously worked (2008–2010) as a special advisor with the Prince's Rainforests Project. He is a fellow of the University of Cambridge Institute for Sustainability Leadership.

Juniper has advised companies including Danone, Interserve and Skanska, assisting with their sustainability strategies. He was a founder of The Robertsbridge Group, which provides advice to companies on sustainability.

He was chair of 10:10, a member of the advisory board of Sandbag, and a board member of Climate for Ideas. He has worked as an ambassador for the National Trust's vision to restore an area of Cambridgeshire wetlands around Wicken Fen. In October 2009 he was elected as a Trustee of the Bedfordshire, Cambridgeshire and Northamptonshire Wildlife Trust. During 2009–2010 he was a member of the advisory group that helped the Science Museum with the development of their new climate science exhibit called Atmosphere. He has chaired the Advisory Board on the Industry campaign Action for Renewables. He has been a member of the Expert Panel advising Bioregional's One Planet Communities programme.

From 2015 to 2019 Juniper was President of the Royal Society of Wildlife Trusts and from 2017 to 2019 he was Executive Director for Advocacy and Campaigns at WWF-UK

Juniper was appointed Commander of the Order of the British Empire (CBE) in the 2017 Birthday Honours for services to conservation.

Political activity
Juniper has worked with all the UK's main political parties, and in January 2009 was selected as the Green Party's parliamentary candidate in the 2010 general election for the Cambridge constituency. He came 4th with 7.6% of the vote, more than doubling the Green Party percentage.

Prior to the 2015 general election, he was one of several public figures who endorsed the parliamentary candidacy of the Green Party's Caroline Lucas.

Natural England
In March 2019, the Environment Secretary, Michael Gove, appointed Tony Juniper to the position of chairman of Natural England. As part of the appointment process, Juniper undertook to relinquish his membership of the Green Party, and to stand down from his executive position as director of advocacy and campaigns at WWF, and as president of the Royal Society for Wildlife Trusts.

Honours and awards
In 2008, Juniper was declared an Honorary Fellow by the Institute of Environmental Sciences and in 2013 an Honorary Fellow of the Society for the Environment. In November 2009 Juniper was the first recipient of the Rothschild Medal, created by the Wildlife Trusts in honour of conservation pioneer Charles Rothschild and his daughter Miriam. In 2011 he became a Patron of the Institute of Ecology and Environmental Management. In 2013, Juniper was awarded Honorary Doctorate of Science Degrees from the universities of Bristol and Plymouth. He has received the Chromy Award from the Conscience Institute, Monaco.

Publications
Parrots: A Guide To The Parrots Of The World (with Mike Parr). 1998. Yale University Press/Pica
Spix's Macaw:  The Race to Save the World's Rarest Bird. 2003. UK:  Fourth Estate/Atria.
How Many Lightbulbs Does it Take to Change a Planet? 95 Ways to Save Planet Earth. 2007.  UK:  Quercus.
Saving Planet Earth. 2007. Harper Collins. Companion volume to BBC series of the same name.
Harmony: A New Way of Looking at Our World (with HRH The Prince of Wales & Ian Skelly). 2010. Harper Collins.
What Has Nature Ever Done For Us?. 2013. Profile.
 What Nature does for Britain. Profile Books, 2015.
What's Really Happening To Our Planet? 2016. Dorling Kindersley.
Climate Change (with HRH The Prince of Wales and Emily Shuckburgh, illus. Ruth Palmer) 2017. Ladybird Books.
 Rainforest - Dispatches From Earth's Most Vital Frontlines. Profile Books, 2018.
Climate Change (with Charles III and Dr Dr Emily Shuckburgh) 2023. Ladybird Books.

References

External links
 Personal website
 Friends of the Earth
 Cambridge Green Party
 Cambridge Institute for Sustainability Leadership

1960 births
Living people
British environmentalists
Green Party of England and Wales parliamentary candidates
British anti–nuclear power activists
Commanders of the Order of the British Empire